Drupadia rufotaenia  is a species of butterfly belonging to the lycaenid family described by Hans Fruhstorfer in 1912. It is found in the Indomalayan realm.

Subspecies
Drupadia rufotaenia rufotaenia (Peninsular Malaysia, Singapore, north-eastern Sumatra, Borneo: eastern Sarawak)
Drupadia rufotaenia archbaldi (Evans, 1932) (Burma, Mergui, Thailand, Langkawi)
Drupadia rufotaenia alcyma (Riley, [1945]) (south-western Sumatra)
Drupadia rufotaenia caesia Cowan, 1974 (Nias)
Drupadia rufotaenia kina Cowan, 1974 (Borneo: Kina Balu, Kretam Hill)
Drupadia rufotaenia torquata Cowan, 1974 (Philippines: Palawan)
Drupadia rufotaenia praecox Cowan, 1974  (Philippines: Mindoro)

References

External links
 Drupadia at Markku Savela's Lepidoptera and Some Other Life Forms

rufotaenia
Butterflies described in 1912